Sujeewa Priyantha Kamalasuriya (9 May 1965 – 26 December 2004) was a Sri Lankan first-class cricketer who played with the Tamil Union Cricket and Athletic Club.

Career 
Kamalasuriya played two 'Youth Tests' for the Sri Lankan Under-19s, led by Aravinda de Silva, when they toured Australia in 1983/84. He was used as an offspinner who batted in the lower order and he took three wickets, including Mark Taylor and Mark Waugh.

His first-class career was brief and consisted of three matches in Group A of the 1988/89 Lakspray Trophy. On his first-class debut against Galle he scored 69 in his first innings and 19 as an opener in his second, dismissed by medium pacer Priyanka de Silva on both occasions. His other matches were against Burgher Recreation Club and Colts Cricket Club. Tamil Union finished the Trophy as runners up to the Sinhalese Sports Club

Instead of continuing in domestic cricket, Kamalasuriya moved to the Australian city of Adelaide where he studied marketing and later opened a cleaning business.

Death 
In December 2004 he travelled back to Sri Lanka with his business partner for a holiday and drowned after being struck by the tsunami at Unawatuna, where he was snorkeling.

References

1965 births
2004 deaths
Sri Lankan cricketers
Cricketers from Colombo
Deaths by drowning
Tamil Union Cricket and Athletic Club cricketers
Victims of the 2004 Indian Ocean earthquake and tsunami
Natural disaster deaths in Sri Lanka